Minnesota State Highway 79 (MN 79) is a  highway in west-central Minnesota, which runs from its intersection with U.S. 59 / State Highway 55 (co-signed) in the city of Elbow Lake and continues east to its eastern terminus at its interchange with Interstate Highway 94/US Highway 52 and Douglas County State-Aid Highway 41 at Evansville Township near Evansville.

Route description
State Highway 79 serves as an east–west route in west-central Minnesota between Elbow Lake and Interstate 94/US Highway 52.

The city of Evansville is located immediately east of the junction of Interstate 94/US Highway 52, Highway 79, and County State-Aid Highway 41.

History
State Highway 79 was authorized in 1933.

All of the route was paved by 1940.

Major intersections

References

079
Transportation in Grant County, Minnesota
Transportation in Douglas County, Minnesota